Gamze Bulut (born August 3, 1992 in Eskişehir) is a Turkish middle-distance runner.

Due to receive the 2012 gold medals as Olympic and European champion following the disqualification of teammate Aslı Çakır Alptekin from both events, Bulut herself came under investigation for abnormalities in her athlete 'passport', and on 1 June 2016, Turkish media reported that  Bulut had also been found to have employed illegal performance enhancing methods by dint of observations of her athlete 'passport'. This was confirmed by the IAAF and Bulut lost her Olympic and European medals, and all medals and records from the date of the infraction, July 20, 2011 to 2016. She received a four-year ban until May 29, 2020.

Career

At the 2009 European Youth Summer Olympic Festival in Tampere, Finland, she became bronze medalist in the 2000 m steeplechase event with a time of 6:50.24. She won the gold medal of the 3000 m steeplechase event at the 2009 Balkan Junior Athletics Championships held in Greece.

Bulut also lost the silver medal in the 1500 meters from the 2012 European Athletics Championships in Helsinki, Finland, when finishing second behind her compatriot Aslı Çakır Alptekin.

She took second place and the silver medal in 1500 m at the 2012 Summer Olympics in London, again finishing behind Alptekin. Bulut had set a personal best time of 4:01:18 in the semi-finals of the competition. Alptekin's results from 2010 onwards were subsequently stripped due to doping offences, making Bulut the de facto Olympic and European champion. However, in March 2016, it was reported that Bulut too was also under investigation for suspected doping.

In 2013, Bulut won the gold medal in the 5000 meters event at the 9th European Athletics U23 Championships held in Tampere, setting a personal best time with 15:45.03.

Personal best
 9:34.88 3000m steeplechase NR (U23) - May 19, 2012 Izmir, Turkey
 15:45.03 5000m PB (U23) - July 14, 2013 Tampere, Finland

International competitions

References

External links

1992 births
Living people
Sportspeople from Eskişehir
Turkish female middle-distance runners
Turkish female steeplechase runners
Fenerbahçe athletes
Olympic athletes of Turkey
Athletes (track and field) at the 2012 Summer Olympics
Medalists at the 2012 Summer Olympics
European Athletics Championships medalists
Olympic silver medalists in athletics (track and field)
Doping cases in athletics